Suritozole (MDL 26,479) is an investigational cognition enhancer. It acts as a partial inverse agonist at the benzodiazepine receptor site on the GABAA ion channel complex, but does not have either anxiogenic or convulsant effects, unlike other BZD inverse agonists such as DMCM. It was investigated for the treatment of depression and Alzheimer's disease, but clinical development seems to have been discontinued.

Synthesis

The reaction between monomethylhydrazine [60-34-4] (1) and methyl isothiocyanate (Trapex) [556-61-6] (2) gave 2,4-dimethylthiosemicarbazide [6621-75-6] (3). Amide formation with 3-fluorobenzoyl chloride [1711-07-5] (4) yielded 1-(3-fluorobenzoyl)-2,4-dimethylthiosemicarbazide [110623-52-4] (5). Cyclization to Suritozole (6).

See also
 GABAA receptor negative allosteric modulator
 GABAA receptor § Ligands

References

Nootropics
Fluoroarenes
Triazoles
Thiocarbonyl compounds
GABAA receptor negative allosteric modulators